Dariusz Dudala (born 14 April 1963) is a former Polish footballer. He is former Kelantan player and became the top scorer for his team 1992.

References

1963 births
Living people
Polish footballers
Kelantan FA players
People from Legnica
Sportspeople from Lower Silesian Voivodeship
Association football forwards